is a Japanese actor and tarento represented by LesPros Entertainment. His former stage name was just  until December 11, 2015.

Biography
Motoki's hobbies are watching DVDs and listening to indie bands. His skills are acrobatics such as parkour and XMA, and swimming. Motoki can also perform the "double corkscrew" His motto is "Kokorozashi Takaku" (High Aspirations). Motoki's has a good relationship with The Prince of Tennis Musicals co-star Ryosuke Ikeoka as classmates from high school.

Filmography

Films

Dramas

Stage

Variety
Regular appearances

Other appearances

Advertising

Photo books

DVDs

CDs

Tokusatsu

References

External links
 

Japanese entertainers
1993 births
Living people
Male actors from Tokyo